William Lorne Nimmo (June 18, 1917 – February 22, 2011) was a television and radio personality whose career spanned seven decades.

Early life and pre-network career
Nimmo was born on June 18, 1917, in Cincinnati, Ohio. After graduating from Western Hills High School, he attended the Cincinnati Conservatory of Music.  He volunteered for the US Army in 1941 prior to the declaration of WWII.  While serving with the 1st Infantry Division in North Africa he was awarded the Purple Heart, Silver Star, and Bronze Star Medals, plus an Invasion Arrowhead and four Campaign Stars. Following a year of diplomatic service at the U.S. Embassy in Paris in 1945-46 he was honorably discharged with the rank of Major.

After a short stint as a teacher, he returned to Cincinnati in 1947 and landed a job as overnight disc jockey at WLW-AM with his distinctive baritone voice.  In 1948 Bill became Cincinnati's first television star on WLWT-TV serving as an announcer, newscaster, and host of various shows.

In 1959, Nimmo recorded a narration, "The Little Rascals" for RCA Victor (LBY 1023).

Career on national television
In 1951 Nimmo moved to New York and went to work for network television. He played “Bill the Bartender” on the Pabst Blue Ribbon Wednesday Night Fights (CBS), in which he appeared live during the commercials to promote the sponsor, Pabst Blue Ribbon beer. He was also Johnny Carson's original sidekick on the shows Do You Trust Your Wife? and later Who Do You Trust?

When Nimmo left the show in 1957, he recommended Ed McMahon as his replacement. When Carson and McMahon moved to The Tonight Show in 1962, Nimmo returned to Who Do You Trust? as announcer-sidekick for new host Woody Woodbury.  Although Bill would later admit leaving Carson was one of the biggest mistakes of his life, he had no regrets.

Nimmo was also an announcer for The Jackie Gleason Show in 1952–53, Crime Syndicated, The Plainclothesman, and This Is Show Business, as well as for Jack Lemmon, Garry Moore and Arthur Murray to name just a few.  He was the spokesperson on long-running shows for Pepsodent, Newport cigarettes, and Schick electric shaver.  In addition he was the host of the game shows Keep It in the Family in 1957–58, For Love or Money in 1958, and announcer on The Regis Philbin Show in 1964–65.

Career after national television
After a year working on The Regis Philbin Show in Los Angeles, Nimmo returned to southwest Ohio for the remainder of his life. In 1966-67 he was the emcee on Be Our Guest (WLWT) with future wife Marian Spelman.  Between 1967 and 1975, he served as the Community Relations Director at the University of Cincinnati, and was the producer of various television and radio shows.  From 1975 to 1983 he was an associate professor of history at Southern State Community College in Fincastle, Ohio. 
In 1988 he narrated Powel Crosley and the 20th Century, bringing him full circle in his broadcasting career.  In addition, he was a volunteer broadcaster at WMKV (89.3 MHz FM), hosting the radio show Two on the Aisle and WMKV Goes to the Pops.

Personal life
Nimmo was married three times and had three children. He was preceded in death by wives: Helen Matthews (died 1969) Helen Gillette (died 2008) and Marian Spellman (died 2007), and one of his sons, Doug (died 1998).

Awards and honors
1956: 'Best Announcer' award from The Auctioneers of America 
1966: Appointed Kentucky Colonel
1991: Cincinnati Broadcasting Hall of Fame 
1998: Distinguished Alumni Award, University of Cincinnati

Medals and decorations

References

1917 births
2011 deaths
American male radio actors
American male voice actors
Recipients of the Silver Star
Radio personalities from Cincinnati